Edward Desmond Russell Eagar (8 December 1917 – 13 September 1977) was an English first-class cricketer who as secretary and captain of Hampshire was instrumental, through organisation, captaincy and recruitment, in raising the county team from perennial also-rans to the point where, in the seasons after he retired from playing, it was runner-up and then, in 1961, the champions in the County Championship for the first time in its history. As a cricketer, he was a right-handed middle-order batsman who bowled occasional slow left-arm orthodox spin, and a fearless fielder at short leg.

Eagar was educated at Cheltenham College and played for Gloucestershire from 1935 to 1939, and for Oxford University in 1938 and 1939. During the Second World War no first-class cricket was played in England. It was therefore seven years before Eagar resumed his county career with Hampshire, for whom he played between 1946 and 1957, captaining the side for those twelve seasons.

Eagar retired from first-class cricket at the end of the 1958 season after playing for the Marylebone Cricket Club. He died in 1977 in Kingsbridge, Devon, at the age of 59. In August 1958 he did some cricket commentary for BBC Radio in the South and West of England only and in 1960 he commentated for Southern Television.

The cricket photographer Patrick Eagar is his son.

References

External links
Desmond Eagar at Cricinfo
Desmond Eagar at CricketArchive

1917 births
1977 deaths
Sportspeople from Cheltenham
English cricketers
Oxford University cricketers
Hampshire cricketers
Hampshire cricket captains
Gloucestershire cricketers
Marylebone Cricket Club cricketers
North v South cricketers
People educated at Cheltenham College
Alumni of Brasenose College, Oxford
English cricket commentators